Loriano Macchiavelli (born March 12, 1934) is an Italian mystery writer and playwright.

Macchiavelli was born in Vergato, near Bologna. He worked also a theatre impresario, actor and playwright.

As a writer, his most famous character is Sarti Antonio (surname written first), a Bolognese police detective, characterized by a strong morality but mediocre investigative capabilities; in his tales he is often helped by the sharper mind of Rosas, a smart university student. Sarti's stories have been turned into a television series in 1991, followed by an Italian-German co-production of six films, broadcast in April and May 1994. He was also the protagonist of a comics series published in the Italian magazine Orient Express.

More recently, Macchiavelli has written a series of detective novels in collaboration with singer-songwriter Francesco Guccini having a Carabinieri maresciallo, Benedetto Santovito, as the protagonist.

Machiavelli's books have been published in France, Germany, Portugal, Spain, Hungary,  Czechoslovakia, Soviet Union, Japan, Romania and other countries.

References 

1934 births
Living people
People from the Province of Bologna
Italian mystery writers
Italian dramatists and playwrights
Italian male dramatists and playwrights